Hounds of Love is the fifth studio album by English musician Kate Bush, released on 16 September 1985 by EMI Records. It was a commercial success and marked a return to the public eye for Bush after the relatively low sales of her previous album, 1982's The Dreaming. The album's lead single, "Running Up That Hill (A Deal with God)", became one of Bush's biggest hits, reaching number 3 in the UK upon release and later giving Bush her second number 1 UK single in June 2022. The album's first side produced three further singles, "Cloudbusting", "Hounds of Love", and "The Big Sky". The second side, subtitled The Ninth Wave, forms a conceptual suite about a woman drifting alone in the sea at night.

Hounds of Love received critical acclaim both on its release and in retrospective reviews. It is considered by many fans and music critics to be Bush's best album, and has been regularly voted one of the greatest albums of all time. It was Bush's second album to top the UK Albums Chart and in the US, it reached the top 40 on the Billboard 200. It is her best-selling studio album, having been certified double platinum for 600,000 sales in the UK, and by 1998 it had sold 1.1 million copies worldwide. The album was nominated at the 1986 Brit Awards for Best British Album, at which Bush was also nominated for Best British Female and Best British Single for "Running Up That Hill". In 2022, the album re-entered various charts, including reaching number one on the Billboard Top Alternative Albums, due to the appearance of "Running Up That Hill" in the Netflix series Stranger Things.

Background and recording

Bush's fourth studio album The Dreaming (1982) had brought her first explorations of solo progressive rock, largely because she could emulate any instrument with the Fairlight CMI, and did not need a band. However, The Dreaming performed less well than her previous album Never for Ever (1980), spending half as much time on the UK Albums Chart.

In the summer of 1983, Bush began laying the groundwork for Hounds of Love at her home recording onto 8-track equipment, using a LinnDrum, Fairlight and piano. Wanting to retain the feel and atmosphere of these early recordings, she had them transferred to 24-track to build the final versions around once recording sessions officially began in November 1983. Following these sessions, as well as several recording sessions in Ireland during the spring of 1984, Bush began overdubbing and mixing the album in a process that took a year and the album was finished in June 1985. The recording sessions included use of the Fairlight CMI synthesiser, piano, traditional Irish instruments, and layered vocals. The chorale in "Hello Earth" is a segment from the traditional Georgian song "Tsintskaro", performed by the Richard Hickox Singers. The lines "It's in the trees! It's coming!" from the beginning of the title track are sampled from a seance scene from the 1957 British horror film Night of the Demon, spoken by actor Maurice Denham.

The album was produced as two suites, with side one being subtitled Hounds of Love and side two a seven-track concept piece subtitled The Ninth Wave. The album has been described as post-progressive because Bush voices themes of love and womanly passion rather than the usual male viewpoints associated with progressive rock.

The Ninth Wave uses a great many textures to express the story: in the style of Alfred, Lord Tennyson's Arthurian poems, Bush pursues a vision quest, taking the listener through a death and rebirth. The warmth of familiar sleep is cut by dangerous speed, ice and frigid water, an otherworldly trial and judgement, an out-of-body limbo, and finally a vigorous emergence and grounding in life energy. The disparate musical elements of "The Ninth Wave" were described by Ron Moy as "classically prog" because of their evident experimentation, and because Bush wholly embraces European music traditions without a trace of American influence.

Release and promotion

On 5 August 1985, Bush performed the new single "Running Up That Hill (A Deal with God)" on Terry Wogan's BBC1 television chat show Wogan. The single entered the UK Singles Chart at number nine and ultimately peaked at number three, becoming Bush's second-highest-charting single after her chart-topping debut single "Wuthering Heights".

The album launch party was held at the London Planetarium on 5 September 1985. The invited guests were treated to a playback of the entire album while watching a laser show inside the Planetarium. Hounds of Love was released on 16 September 1985 by EMI Records on vinyl, XDR cassette and compact disc formats. It entered the UK Albums Chart at number one, knocking Madonna's Like a Virgin (1984) from the top position. The album marked Bush's breakthrough into the American charts with the Top 40 hit "Running Up That Hill (A Deal with God)". The album also yielded a set of music videos, one of which was "Cloudbusting", directed by Julian Doyle and co-starring Donald Sutherland. The video, like the song, was inspired by the life of psychologist Wilhelm Reich.

As a companion to the album, a 20-minute videotape and LaserDisc, The Hair of the Hound, containing music videos for the four singles, was released in 1986.

On 16 June 1997, a remastered version of the album was issued on CD as part of EMI's "First Centenary" reissue series. The "EMI First Centenary" edition included six bonus tracks: 12″ mixes of "The Big Sky" and "Running Up That Hill (A Deal with God)", and the B-sides "Under the Ivy", "Burning Bridge", "My Lagan Love", and "Be Kind to My Mistakes", the last of which was written for Nicolas Roeg's 1986 film Castaway and plays during the opening scene.

In 2010, Audio Fidelity reissued Hounds of Love on vinyl with new remastering by Steve Hoffman.

A 10" pink vinyl record with four songs taken from the album ("The Big Sky", "Cloudbusting", "Watching You Without Me" and "Jig of Life") was released by Audio Fidelity (catalogue number AFZEP 001) on 16 April 2011 for Record Store Day 2011, limited to 1000 copies worldwide.

In the 2014 Before the Dawn concerts, Bush performed almost all of the album's tracks live for the first time, with the exceptions of "The Big Sky" and "Mother Stands for Comfort". "Running Up That Hill (A Deal with God)" had been already performed live in 1987 with David Gilmour of Pink Floyd at the Secret Policeman's Third Ball.

Critical reception

In the UK, most reviews of the album at the time of its release were overwhelmingly positive. In a five-star review, Sounds called Hounds of Love "dramatic, moving and wildly, unashamedly, beautifully romantic", before going on to state, "If I were allowed to swear, I'd say that Hounds of Love is f***ing brilliant, but me mum won't let me". Record Mirror also gave the album five stars, stating that it "recaptures the ground Kate lost with her last album" and concluding, "A howling success? I think so." NME said, "Hounds of Love is definitely weird. It's not an album for the suicidal or mums and dads. The violence of The Dreaming has turned into despair, confusion and fear – primarily of love, a subject that remains central to Bush's songwriting." The review then went on to scorn the idea that by signing to EMI Records as a teenager, Bush had allowed herself to be moulded in their corporate image, suggesting that on the contrary, it had enabled her to use the system for her own devices: "Our Kate's a genius, the rarest solo artist this country's ever produced. She makes sceptics dance to her tune. The company's daughter has truly screwed the system and produced the best album of the year doing it." Melody Maker was more reserved, saying, "Here she has learned you can have control without sacrificing passion and it's the heavyweight rhythm department aided and abetted by some overly fussy arrangements that get the better of her". It was particularly disappointed by The Ninth Wave suite on the second side of the record, feeling that "she makes huge demands on her listener and the theme is too confused and the execution too laborious and stilted to carry real weight as a complete entity".

In the US, reaction to the record was mixed. Awarding the record the title of "platter du jour" (i.e. album of the day), Spin observed that "with traces of classical, operatic, tribal and twisted pop styles, Kate creates music that observes no boundaries of musical structure or inner expression". The review noted "while her eclecticism is welcomed and rewarded in her homeland her genius is still ignored here – a situation that is truly a shame for an artist so adventurous and naturally theatrical", and hoped that "this album might gain her some well-deserved recognition from the American mainstream". However, Rolling Stone, in their first ever review of a Kate Bush record, was unimpressed: "The Mistress of Mysticism has woven another album that both dazzles and bores. Like the Beatles on their later albums, Bush is not concerned about having to perform the music live, and her orchestrations swell to the limits of technology. But unlike the Beatles, Bush often overdecorates her songs with exotica ... There's no arguing that Bush is extraordinarily talented, but as with Jonathan Richman, rock's other eternal kid, her vision will seem silly to those who believe children should be seen and not heard." The New York Times characterised the album's music as "slightly precious, calculated female art rock" and called Bush "a real master of instrumental textures."

In retrospective reviews, The Independent called Hounds "a prog-pop masque of an album". Pitchfork gave the album a perfect score, noting that the album draws from synth-pop and progressive rock whilst remaining wholly distinct from either style. Spin called it an "art-pop classic".

Accolades
In 2020, Rolling Stone ranked Hounds of Love at number 68 on its list of the 500 Greatest Albums of All Time.

Pitchfork included the album at number four on their list of The 200 Best Albums of the 1980s.

In a poll of the public conducted by NPR, Hounds of Love was voted in fourth place in its list of 150 greatest albums ever made by female artists.

The album was placed at number 10 in the NME critics' list of the best albums of 1985.

In 1998, Q magazine readers voted Hounds of Love the 48th-greatest album of all time, while two years later the same magazine placed it at number 20 in its list of the "100 Greatest British Albums Ever", and the third "Greatest Album of All-Time by a Female Artist" in 2002. In 2006, Q placed the album at number four in its list of "40 Best Albums of the '80s". In January 2006, NME named it the 41st-best British album of all time. The 19th edition of British Hit Singles & Albums, published by Guinness in May 2006, included a list of the Top 100 albums of all time, as voted by readers of the book and NME readers, which placed Hounds of Love at number 70. In 2008, The Atlanta Journal-Constitution said the album should be given consideration when listing albums released between 1978 and 1988 that have stood the test of time while remaining influential and enjoyable to this day. In 2012, Slant Magazine listed the album at number 10 on its list of "Best Albums of the 1980s". NME placed Hounds of Love 48th on its "500 Greatest Albums of All Time" list.

Track listing

Notes:

The original 1985 cassette release included the 12″ single version of "Running Up That Hill (A Deal with God)" at the end of side one.

The 2011 Fish People re-release and the 2018 remastered album substitute the "Special Single Mix" version of "The Big Sky", as opposed to the original album version.

Personnel
Credits are adapted from the Hounds of Love liner notes.

Kate Bush – vocals, Fairlight synthesizer, piano
Alan Murphy – guitar on tracks 1, 3, 8
Del Palmer – LinnDrum programming, bass guitar on 1, 10 and 12, handclaps on 3, backing vocals on 5, Fairlight bass on 8
Paddy Bush – balalaika on 1, backing vocals on 5, didgeridoo on 3, harmony vocals on 7, violins and fujara on 12
Stuart Elliott – drums on 1, 2, 4, 5, 9, 10 and 11
Charlie Morgan – drums on 2, 3, 5, 8 and 10, handclaps on 3
Jonathan Williams – cello on 2
Martin Glover – bass guitar on 3
Morris Pert – percussion on 3
Eberhard Weber – double bass on 4 and 11
The Medici Sextet – strings on 5
Dave Lawson – string arrangements on 5
Brian Bath – backing vocals on 5, guitar on 11
John Carder Bush – backing vocals on 5; narration on 10
Dónal Lunny – bouzouki on 6, 10 and 11, bodhrán on 10
John Sheahan – whistles on 6 and 10, fiddles on 10
Kevin McAlea – synthesizer, sequencer on 8 and 12
Danny Thompson – double bass on 9
Liam O'Flynn – uilleann pipes on 10 and 11
The Richard Hickox Singers – choir on 11
Richard Hickox – vocals, choir master on 11
Michael Berkeley – vocal arrangements on 11
John Williams – guitar on 12

Production
Brian Tench – engineer, mixing (except on 2 and 4)
Del Palmer – engineer
Haydn Bendall – engineer
Paul Hardiman – engineer
Nigel Walker – engineer
Michael Kaman  (Orchestral Arrangements)
James Guthrie – engineer
Bill Somerville-Large – engineer at Windmill Lane Studios
Pearce Dunne – assistant engineer
Julian Mendelsohn – mixing on 2 and 4
Ian Cooper – cutting engineer
Chris Blair – digital remastering
Photography for the sleeve was by Kate's brother, John Carder Bush, and the sleeve design was by Bill Smith Studio and Kate Bush.

Charts

Weekly charts

Year-end charts

Certifications and sales

Notes

References

Bibliography

See also
; inspiration for The Ninth Wave Suite

External links

Hounds of Love (Adobe Flash) at Spotify (streamed copy where licensed)
 

1985 albums
Kate Bush albums
Concept albums
EMI Records albums
Progressive pop albums